Kwak Ji-min (born Kwak Sun-hee on February 13, 1985) is a South Korean actress. She is best known overseas for her leading role in the Kim Ki-duk film Samaritan Girl, for which she won Best New Actress at the 2004 Busan Film Critics Awards.

Filmography

Film
And the Sun (short film, 2013)
My PS Partner (2012) - Ara
The Wedding Scandal (2012) - Jung-eun/So-eun 
The Beat Goes On (2012) - Jo Ara 
Link (2011) - Park Soo-jung 
Flipping (short film, 2010) - Mi-yong 
Girl by Girl (2007) - Oh Se-ri
Red Eye (2005) - So-hee
Samaritan Girl (2004) - Yeo-jin
Wishing Stairs (2003) - dance class junior

Television series
Shining Romance (MBC, 2013) - Oh Yoon-na
Good Doctor (KBS2, 2013) - Lee Soo-jin (guest, ep 10-12)
Fantasy Tower (tvN, 2013) - Yoo-mi
Hur Jun, the Original Story (MBC, 2013) - Gu Un-nyeon
Phantom (SBS, 2012) - Kwon Eun-seol (guest, ep 7)
I Am Sam (KBS2, 2007) - Da-bin
Merry Mary (MBC, 2007) - Choi Bi-dan
Dasepo Girl: The Series (Super Action, 2006) - Double Eyes
Lovers in Prague (SBS, 2005) - Jung Yeon-soo
Love Is All Around (MBS, 2004) - Jin Pa-rang
Sharp (KBS2, 2004) - Kang Dong-hee
Honest Living (SBS, 2003) - Da-hyun
The Bean Chaff of My Life (MBC, 2003) 
Drama City "My Beautiful First Love" (KBS2, 2003) - young Mi-young

Music video
 Lee Jin-sung - "Sorry" (2009)
 Kagerou - "Shiroi Karasu" (2004)

Theater
The Special Winter  (2013)

Discography

Radio program
Dating in the Afternoon with Kwak Ji-min (KFM, 2006)

Awards
2012 20th Korean Culture and Entertainment Awards: Excellence Award, Actress in Film (Wedding Scandal)
2004 5th Busan Film Critics Awards: Best New Actress (Samaritan Girl)

References

External links 
 
 
 Kwak Ji-min Fan Cafe at Naver
 
 
 

South Korean television actresses
South Korean film actresses
1985 births
Living people
21st-century South Korean actresses